Robert Dean Stethem (November 17, 1961 – June 15, 1985) was a United States Navy Seabee diver who was murdered by the Lebanese armed forces during the hijacking of the commercial airliner he was aboard, TWA Flight 847. At the time of his death, his Navy rating was Steelworker Second Class (SW2). He was posthumously promoted to Master Chief Constructionman (CUCM).

Early life
Stethem was born in Waterbury, Connecticut, but grew up in Virginia Beach, Virginia, and Waldorf, Maryland. He was one of four children. His father, Richard Stethem, retired from the Navy as a Senior Chief after 20 years, continuing to work for it as a civilian afterwards. His mother, Patricia, served in the Navy before raising her family, continuing to serve in the U.S. Court of Appeals for the Armed Forces afterwards. His brother, Chief Boatswain’s Mate Kenneth Stethem was a Navy SEAL and brother Diver First Class Patrick Stethem served in Underwater Construction Team One for 10 years – the same unit in which Robert served. Stethem had one sister, Sheryl Sierralta.

He graduated from Thomas Stone High School in 1980, where he played defensive back on the varsity and junior varsity football teams. He also played Little League baseball.

Stethem joined the Navy shortly after graduating, reporting for duty on May 4, 1981.

Navy career
In the Navy, Stethem was a Seabee Steelworker assigned to Naval Mobile Construction Battalion 62 in Gulfport, Mississippi. He served multiple tours on Diego Garcia and Guam. Later, Stethem became a 2nd Class Navy Diver and was assigned to the Navy's Underwater Construction Team One in Little Creek, Virginia.

TWA Flight 847

On June 14, 1985, Stethem was returning from an assignment in Nea Makri, Greece, aboard TWA Flight 847 when it was hijacked by terrorists of the Lebanese organization Hezbollah.  The terrorists held 39 people hostage for 17 days, demanding the release of 766 Lebanese and Palestinian terrorists held by Israel.

When their demands were not met, Stethem, as a member of the U.S. military, was targeted, beaten, and tortured. Finally, the terrorists shot him in the temple and dumped his body onto the tarmac at the Beirut airport.

One of the terrorists, Mohammed Ali Hammadi, was arrested two years later in Frankfurt, Germany. He was tried and convicted of Stethem's murder and sentenced to life in prison but was released in 2005 after serving 19 years. Three others, Imad Mugniyah, Hassan Izz-Al-Din, and Ali Atwa, were eventually indicted for their involvement in the incident. In 2002, they were added to the FBI Most Wanted Terrorists list. On February 13, 2008, Mugniyah was killed in an explosion in Damascus, Syria.  On September 21, 2019, an unnamed terrorist hijacker was arrested while disembarking a cruise ship that had ported in Greece. His identity came up as being wanted by Germany during a passport check.

Awards and decorations
Stethem was posthumously awarded the Purple Heart and Bronze Star. He is buried in Arlington National Cemetery, Section 59, Grave 430, near other American victims of international terrorism.

On August 24, 2010, in Yokosuka, Japan, on board the ship named after him – the USS Stethem (DDG-63) – Stethem was made an honorary  Master Chief Constructionman (CUCM) by order of the Master Chief Petty Officer of the Navy. His brother, Kenneth, accepted the certificate and decorations on behalf of the Stethem family.

On April 24, 2015, Secretary of the Navy Ray Mabus presented the Prisoner of War medal to Stethem's parents.

Honors

The following are named after Stethem:
 The Robert D. Stethem Memorial Sports Complex, Waldorf, Maryland
 The Robert D. Stethem Educational Center, a vocational school in Pomfret, Maryland
 Robert D. Stethem Barracks, Training Support Center Hampton Roads, Virginia Beach, Virginia
 Stethem Memorial Navy Lodge, Naval Construction Battalion Center, Gulfport, Mississippi
 Headquarters building and a street on the base, Port Hueneme Naval Construction Training Center, near Oxnard, California
 USS Stethem (DDG-63), an Aegis Arleigh Burke-class destroyer, commissioned 1995

In popular culture

A scene from the movie The Delta Force shows a U.S. Navy diver being beaten, tortured, murdered and his body being dumped onto the tarmac. This scene is based on Stethem's terrorist murder.

Stethem was portrayed by Steven Eckholdt in the 1988 TV movie The Taking of Flight 847: The Uli Derickson Story.

See also
 Aircraft hijacking

References

External links
 Robert Dean Stethem, ArlingtonCemetery.net, an unofficial website 

1961 births
1985 deaths
1985 murders in Asia
Seabees
Burials at Arlington National Cemetery
American people murdered abroad
People murdered in Lebanon
Deaths by firearm in Lebanon
People from Waterbury, Connecticut
People from Virginia Beach, Virginia
People from Waldorf, Maryland